Yusuf al-Qa'id (born 2 April 1944) is an Egyptian novelist. He is best known in the West for War in the Land of Egypt (1978), first English edition in 2004 (transl. Olive Kenny, Lorne Kenny, Christopher Tingley), the basis for the 1991 film of the same name.

He is also known for his writing in vernacular Egyptian Arabic. His 1994 novel Laban el-Asfur was the first major Arabic vernacular novel of the modern era. Although criticized for his language choice at the time, vernacular novels in Egypt have been relatively uncontroversial since.

References

1944 births
Living people
20th-century Egyptian writers
Egyptian male short story writers
Egyptian novelists